Danielle Scott (born 7 March 1990) is an Australian freestyle skier specialising in Aerial Skiing. Scott represented Australia at the 2014 Olympic Winter Games. She won a bronze medal at the 2013 FIS Freestyle World Ski Championships. Scott was offered a scholarship for Artistic Gymnastics at the age of 7 at the Australian Institute of Sport, being the youngest athlete to be offered a scholarship at the Australian Institute of Sport.

World Cup results
All results are sourced from the International Ski Federation (FIS).

Season standings

Race podiums
 3 wins – (3 AE)
 10 podiums – (10 AE)

Olympic results

World Championships results
 2 medals – (1 silver, 1 bronze)

References

External links

1990 births
Living people
Australian female freestyle skiers
Freestyle skiers at the 2014 Winter Olympics
Freestyle skiers at the 2018 Winter Olympics
Freestyle skiers at the 2022 Winter Olympics
Olympic freestyle skiers of Australia
Skiers from Sydney